Belong is the second studio album by American indie pop band The Pains of Being Pure at Heart. It was released on March 29, 2011 by Slumberland Records. The album was chiefly produced by Flood. The band recorded Belong at the Manhattan studio Stratosphere Sound and Flood's London studio Assault & Battery 2 throughout the summer of 2010, in between touring stints.

Background
In an interview with Pitchfork, vocalist and guitarist Kip Berman explained that the band "wanted the songs to exist in an immediate and instinctual place." He continued:

Release
In February 2011, The Pains of Being Pure at Heart announced that the album would be titled Belong. On March 10, 2011, the full album was made available to stream on the band's website. Belong was officially released on March 29, 2011 by Slumberland Records. In the United Kingdom, it was released by the Fortuna Pop! label. Prior to its release, two singles were issued from the album: "Heart in Your Heartbreak" on December 14, 2010, and "Belong" on March 7, 2011. A third single, "The Body", was released on July 25, 2011.

The Pains of Being Pure at Heart performed "Heart in Your Heartbreak" on the March 23, 2011 episode of Late Show with David Letterman. In April and May 2011, the band embarked on a tour of the United States in promotion of Belong, on which they were supported by the musician Twin Shadow. Throughout the rest of the year, they toured Europe and the United States. In 2012, the band performed in Australia, New Zealand, and Singapore for the St Jerome's Laneway Festival, and toured Asia.

On April 21, 2012, the band released Acid Reflex, a four-track EP consisting of remixes of songs from Belong, for Record Store Day.

Critical reception

Belong was received positively by music critics. It earned a score of 76 out of 100, indicating "generally favorable reviews", on the review aggregation website Metacritic.

Track listing

Personnel
Credits are adapted from the album's liner notes.

The Pains of Being Pure at Heart
 Kip Berman – guitar, vocals
 Kurt Feldman – drums, percussion
 Christoph Hochheim – guitar
 Alex Naidus – bass, backing vocals
 Peggy Wang – keyboards, vocals

Production

 James Brown – engineering, production on "Too Tough"
 John Catlin – assistance (mixing)
 Flood – production, recording
 Joe LaPorta – mastering
 Darren Lawson – engineering
 Emily Lazar – mastering
 Catherine Marks – engineering (mixing)
 Atsuo Matsumoto – assistance (New York recording sessions)
 Alan Moulder – mixing
 Drew Smith – assistance (London recording sessions)
 Adam Tilzer – assistance (New York recording sessions)

Design

 Winston Chmielinski – front cover artwork
 Pavla Kopecna – photography
 Michael Schulman – layout

Charts

References

External links
 

2011 albums
The Pains of Being Pure at Heart albums
Albums produced by Flood (producer)
Slumberland Records albums
Fortuna Pop! Records albums